Kampfbereit is a live video album by Canadian electro-industrial band Front Line Assembly, recorded in 2011 and released on April 7, 2015, through MVD Visual. It was shot during the band's 2011 Improvised.Electronice.Device Tour at the Kinetik Festival in Montreal and a number of North American cities.

Track listing

Personnel

Front Line Assembly
 Bill Leeb – vocals
 Jeremy Inkel – electronic instruments
 Jared Slingerland – guitar
 Jason Bazinet – drums

Technical personnel
 Anastasia Blink – production, direction, editing
 Vlad McNeally – artwork
 Vladimir Potrosky – audio mixing
 Ryan Merrick – DVD authoring
 Olivier Adam – second location direction

References

Video albums by Canadian artists
Front Line Assembly live albums
2015 live albums